Seriatopora caliendrum is a species of colonial stony coral in the family Pocilloporidae. It forms a bushy clump and is commonly known as the green birdsnest coral. It is native to East Africa, the Red Sea and the western Indo-Pacific region, the type locality being the Red Sea. The International Union for Conservation of Nature has assessed the conservation status of this species as being "near threatened".

Description
Seriatopora caliendrum resembles Seriatopora hystrix but is less common. The branches are rather thicker and have blunter tips. The corallites are mostly hooded so that robust colonies resemble slender colonies of Stylophora pistillata, however the corallites are in neat rows and have oval openings, which is not the case in S. pistillata.

References

Pocilloporidae
Corals described in 1834
Taxa named by Christian Gottfried Ehrenberg